Water stagnation occurs when water stops flowing. Stagnant water can be a major environmental hazard.

Dangers

Malaria and dengue are among the main dangers of stagnant water, which can become a breeding ground for the mosquitoes that transmit these diseases.

Stagnant water can be dangerous for drinking because it provides a better incubator than running water for many kinds of bacteria and parasites. Stagnant water can be contaminated with human and animal feces, particularly in deserts or other areas of low rainfall. Water stagnation for as little as six days can completely change bacterial community composition and increase cell count.

Stagnant water may be classified into the following basic, although overlapping, types:

 Water body stagnation (stagnation in swamp, lake, lagoon, river, etc.)
 Surface and ground waters stagnation
 Trapped water stagnation. The water may be trapped in human artifacts (discarded cans, plant pots, tires, dug-outs, roofs, etc.), as well as in natural containers, such as hollow tree trunks, leaf sheath, etc.

To avoid ground and surface water stagnation, drainage of surface and subsoil is advised. Areas with a shallow water table are more susceptible to ground water stagnation due to the lower availability of natural soil drainage.

Life that may thrive in stagnant water
Some plants prefer flowing water, while others, such as lotuses, prefer stagnant water.

Various anaerobic bacteria are commonly found in stagnant water.  For this reason, pools of stagnant water have historically been used in processing hemp and some other fiber crops, as well as linden bark used for making bast shoes. Several weeks of soaking makes bast fibers easily separable due to bacterial and fermentative processes known as retting.

Denitrifying bacteria
Leptospira
Purple bacteria (both sulfur and non-sulfur)

Fish
 Lepisosteidae (gar)
 Northern snakehead fish
 Pygmy gourami
 Spotted barb
 Walking catfish
 Asian swamp eel

Insects
Stagnant water is the favorite breeding ground for a number of insects.
 Dragonfly nymphs
 Fly maggots
 Mosquito larvae
 Nepidae (water scorpions)

Other
 Algae
 Biofilm
 A number of species of frogs prefer stagnant water.
 Some species of turtles
 Mata mata

See also
 Eutrophication (excessive enrichment by nutrients and minerals)
 Slough
 Wetland
 Residence time distribution
 Water pollution

References

Environmental soil science
Water pollution
Liquid water
Aquifers
Aquatic ecology
Water supply
Waterborne diseases
Wetlands